Berberis glauca is a shrub in the Berberidaceae described as a species in 1821. It is native to Ecuador and Colombia.

References

glauca
Flora of South America
Plants described in 1821